The 1975 IFA Shield Final was the 79th final of the IFA Shield, the second oldest football competition in India, and was contested between Kolkata giants East Bengal and Mohun Bagan on 30 September 1975 at the Mohun Bagan Ground in Kolkata.

East Bengal won the final 5–0 to claim their 14th IFA Shield title. Shyam Thapa scored a brace while Surajit Sengupta, Ranjit Karmakar and Subhankar Sanyal scored one each as East Bengal defeated their arch-rivals Mohun Bagan in a record margin to lift their fourth consecutive IFA Shield title.

Route to the final

East Bengal

East Bengal entered the 1975 IFA Shield as the three times defending champions, and started their campaign directly from the quarter-final stage. East Bengal faced Police AC in the last eight and defeated them 5–0 with Surajit Sengupta scoring a hattrick for the team while Samaresh Chowdhury and Shyam Thapa scored the other two. In the semi-final, East Bengal faced Behala Youth and won 7–0 with Surajit Sengupta scoring four goals and Ranjit Mukherjee, Pradip Dutta and Subhankar Sanyal scoring one each as East Bengal reached the IFA Shield final for the twenty-second time.

Mohun Bagan

Mohun Bagan entered the 1975 IFA Shield as one of the Kolkata giants and was supposed to start their campaign directly from the quarter-finals against Kalighat Club however, Kalighat had informed the Indian Football Association about their inability to field a team and Mohun Bagan received a walkover into the semi-finals. In the semi-final, Mohun Bagan defeated Tollygunge Agragami 4–1 with Sisir Guha Dastidar scoring twice and Bijoy Dikpati and Johor Das scoring one each as Mohun Bagan reached the finals. Srikumar Chakraborty scored the only goal for Tollygunge in the defeat.

Match

Details

See also
IFA Shield Finals

References

IFA Shield finals
1975–76 in Indian football
East Bengal Club matches
Mohun Bagan AC matches
Football competitions in Kolkata